Tim Gilbert (born 29 October 1967) is an Australian journalist and radio and TV personality

Career
Gilbert's media career began at Radio 2GN in Goulburn and 2UE.

In 1996, he joined the Nine Network and since then has been a sport presenter, commentator, reporter and producer on the network. He has presented sport reports on Nine News and was also a reporter on The Cricket Show and The NRL Footy Show.

Gilbert has covered a number of sporting events both in Australia and around the world including the 2012 London Olympics and the 2010 Vancouver Winter Olympics.

In February 2009, Gilbert was appointed weekend sports presenter on Weekend Today.

Gilbert has also been a fill-in host on Friday Night NRL if Cameron Williams is away.

In September 2014, Gilbert was announced as Ben Fordham's replacement on Today. He commenced his new role in November.

In January 2019, Tim announced that his last day with the Today Show is 12 January 2019 after working with Nine Network for 22 years. Tony Jones would replace Gilbert as sport presenter on Today.

Gilbert is now a presenter on Sky News Australia's show The Business of Sport.

Personal life
Gilbert is married with children.

His brother is Sky News Australia presenter Kieran Gilbert.

References

External links
Today
Nine News

Living people
Australian people of Lebanese descent
1967 births
Sky News Australia reporters and presenters